Samlar kako is a traditional soup dish of Cambodia. It is also considered one of Cambodian's national dishes. Samlar kako consists of green kroeung, prahok, roasted ground rice, catfish, pork or chicken, vegetables, fruits and herbs.

Unlike other Khmer dishes, this can be served as a one-pot dish because it is a well-balanced meal on its own. Some prefer it as a vegetarian dish where the fish and meat are omitted and replaced by coconut cream and vegetable stock.

Gallery

References

Cambodian soups
Vegetable dishes
National dishes